Sripada Yellampalli Project is an irrigation project located at Yellampalli Village, Ramagundam Rural Mandal, between Peddapalli district - Mancherial District in Telangana State, India. The project is fourth largest on the Godavari River in Telangana region. It is named after late legislator, D. Sripada Rao.

Project info
Sripada Yellampalli irrigation project foundation was laid by Chief Minister of Andhra Pradesh, Y. S. Rajasekhara Reddy on 28 July 2004.

The project is designed to utilize about 63 tmc of water at a cost of Rs. 900 crores in the first phase. In the second phase, about 49.5 tmc would be lifted to the upland regions of Karimnagar, Adilabad, Nizamabad, Warangal and Medak districts, with 6 tmc water allotted for the NTPC Ramagundam project. After the flood gates are installed, the project could would store about 20 Tmcft of water.

The project operational requirement is 163 MW power and 469 million KWh of electrical energy annually to pump the water. The project would supply water for NTPC power project reservoir in Ramagundam Mandal in Karimnagar.
It commenced operation in 2005 near Mormoor and Yellampalli village at Ramagundam and mainly supplies drinking water to Ramagundam Godavarikhani city and Hyderabad city.

See also
 Sriram Sagar Project
 Medigadda Barrage
 Annaram Barrage
 Sundilla Barrage
 Lower Manair Dam
 Mid Manair Dam
 Kaddam Project
 Upper Manair Dam
 SRSP Flood Flow Canal
 Nizam Sagar
 Pranahita Chevella
 Alisagar lift irrigation scheme
 Maulana Abul Kalam Hyderabad Sujala Saravanthi scheme
 Sri Komaram Bheem Project
 Devadula lift irrigation scheme
 Icchampally Project

References

Dams on the Godavari River
Dams in Telangana
Irrigation in Telangana
Adilabad district
Karimnagar district
Godavari basin